Iwaruna biguttella is a moth of the family Gelechiidae. It was described by Philogène Auguste Joseph Duponchel in 1843. It is found in Portugal, Spain, France, on Sardinia, Italy, Austria, Switzerland, Croatia, Romania, Ukraine, Russia and Asia Minor.

References

Moths described in 1843
Iwaruna